Kancheepuram taluk is a taluk of Kancheepuram district of the Indian state of Tamil Nadu. The headquarters of the taluk is the town of Kanchipuram.

Demographics
According to the 2011 census, the taluk of Kanchipuram had a population of 497,149 with 248,632 males and 248,517 females. There were 1,000 women for every 1,000 men. The taluk had a literacy rate of 72.92%. Child population in the age group below 6 was 24,301 Males and 23,737 Females.

References 

Taluks of Kanchipuram district